Vanuatu Cricket, officially the Vanuatu Cricket Association, is the national governing body of the sport of cricket in Vanuatu. Its current headquarters is in Port Vila, Vanuatu. Vanuatu Cricket Association is Vanuatu's representative at the International Cricket Council and is an associate member and has been a member of that body since 2009. It is also a member of the East Asia-Pacific Cricket Council. The Senior Men's Team achieved Associate status with the ICC after winning the prestigious ICC EAP Cup in 2009 (undefeated).

In March 2021, Tim Cutler, formerly the CEO of Hong Kong Cricket Association, was appointed as the CEO of Vanuatu Cricket replacing Shane Deitz. He was expected to commence his term as CEO from mid-April 2021.

History
The game of cricket was introduced to the country by English Expatriates during colonization when the country known as the New Hebrides, and has been played in Vanuatu since around 1905.

The Vanuatu Cricket Association began upon affiliation with the International Cricket Council (ICC) in 1995 and later gained associate status in 2005. 

The commencement of the Community Cricket Development Program in the year 2000 has been the key component in the growth of cricket in Vanuatu. The program which started with 400 participants in the year 2000, is now rolled out to numerous schools and communities throughout Efate, Espiritu Santo, Malekula and Tanna encouraging many juniors to take up the game.

Vanuatu Cricket also maintains a strong local club competitions structure at both junior and senior levels which feeds into our high performance streams.

To date Vanuatu Cricket has grown to have roughly 25,000+ participants, approximately 10% of the total population of Vanuatu, through its development programs, an annual club cricket season from February to November each year, a sport for development program in partnership with the Pacific Sports Partnership Program (soon to be Australian Sports Partnership Program) aimed at combating NCD's, promote social inclusion and soon to include a Gender Based program to use cricket to combat Gender Based Violence in our communities and country and 3 High Performance teams representing Vanuatu at International and regional competitions, National Men, Women and U19s team.

References

External links

Cricinfo-Vanuatu
Vanuatu-FB

Cricket administration